William Alan Eames (born 20 September 1957) is an English retired professional footballer who played as a midfielder in the Football League for Portsmouth and Brentford. He went on to play for over 15 years in non-League football.

Personal life 
Eames attended Emsworth Primary School. He later became a PE teacher at Neville Lovett Community School, Horndean Technology College and Cams Hill School.

Career statistics

References

1957 births
English footballers
English Football League players
Brentford F.C. players
Living people
People from Emsworth
Association football midfielders
Portsmouth F.C. players
Waterlooville F.C. players
Southern Football League players